Alianza is a municipality in the Honduran department of Valle.

Demographics
At the time of the 2013 Honduras census, Alianza municipality had a population of 7,491. Of these, 98.84% were Mestizo, 0.89% White, 0.20% Black or Afro-Honduran and 0.07% Indigenous, .

References

Municipalities of the Valle Department